The 2019 Norwegian Football Cup Final was the final match of the 2019 Norwegian Football Cup, the 114th season of the Norwegian Football Cup, the premier Norwegian football cup competition organized by the Norwegian Football Federation (NFF). The match was played on 8 December 2019 at the Ullevaal Stadion in Oslo, and opposed two Eliteserien sides, FK Haugesund and Viking FK. 8 December is the latest time of the year the Norwegian Cup Final has ever been played.

Viking defeated Haugesund 1–0 to claim the Norwegian Cup for the sixth time in their history, the first time since 2001. Viking's captain, Zlatko Tripić, scored the game-winning goal, a penalty after 51 minutes. As a result, Viking qualified for the Europa League second qualifying round.

Background
Haugesund finished the 2019 Eliteserien season in 7th place. Viking, on the other hand, finished the league season in 5th place as a newly promoted side. Haugesund and Viking are both from the county of Rogaland, and this was the first time in ten years that two teams from the same county played in the final. This final was Haugesund's second ever appearance in a Norwegian Cup Final, the last time being in 2007, when they lost against Lillestrøm. Viking last made a cup final appearance in 2001, when they won against another Rogaland club, Bryne. Prior to this year's edition, Viking have made a total of ten appearances in the cup final, winning it on five occasions.

Route to the final

Note: In all results below, the score of the finalist is given first.

Key:

ES = Eliteserien team
D1 = 1. divisjon team
D2 = 2. divisjon team
D3 = 3. divisjon team
D4 = 4. divisjon team

H = Home
A = Away
a.e.t. = After extra time
p = Penalty shoot-out
o.g. = Own goal
pen. = Penalty goal

Match

Details

See also
2019 Norwegian Football Cup
2019 Eliteserien
2019 in Norwegian football

References

2019
Viking FK matches
FK Haugesund matches
Football Cup
Sports competitions in Oslo
Norwegian Football Cup
2010s in Oslo
Final